Jang Shin-young (born January 17, 1984) is a South Korean actress. She made her entertainment debut through a local beauty contest in 2001, and is best known for her portrayal of the femme fatale lead in the E Channel drama The Empress (2011). She was cast in the leading role in Flower of Revenge (2013), the first daily drama by cable station jTBC.

Biography
She married Wi Seung-cheol, a marketing director at Bae Yong-joon's management agency BOF, on November 18, 2006. The couple divorced in 2009; they have a son.

In 2018, Jang announced she will marry for the second time to her Flower of Revenge co-star Kang Kyung-joon

Filmography

Television drama

Film

Music video 
 "Take a Drink With You" (Davichi, 2013)
 "Wash" (Seo In-young, 2011)
 "Wounded" (Min Kyung-hoon, 2010)
 "Ping" (Clazziquai, 2009)
 "어떻게 사람이 그래" (Noblesse, 2009)
 "Bye Bye Bye" (Monday Kiz, 2005)
 "A Thorn Tree That Loved Yearning" (Tei, 2005)
 "Did We Really Love" (Browneyed Soul, 2003)

Variety show 
 Beauty Up (jTBC, 2012)
 Law of the Jungle W (SBS, 2012) 
 Fashion of Cry (On Style, 2011)
 Fox's Butler (MBC, 2010)
 TV Entertainment Tonight (SBS, 2004-2005)
 Guesthouse Daughters  (KBS, 2017)
 Same Bed, Different Dreams 2 - You Are My Destiny (SBS, 2017)
 Cooking - The Birth of a Cooking King (JTBC, 2021)

Discography

Awards 
 2017 MBC Drama Awards: Golden Acting Award, Actress in a Miniseries (Radiant Office)
 2012 SBS Drama Awards: Special Acting Award, Actress in a Miniseries (The Chaser)
 2001 71st Miss Chunhyang Contest

References

External links

 
 
 Jang Shin-young at MGB Entertainment
 

1984 births
Living people
South Korean television actresses
South Korean film actresses